Delante Johnson (born August 13, 1998) is an American professional boxer. As an amateur he won a gold medal at the 2016 Youth World Championships and bronze at the 2019 Pan American Games.

Johnson represented the United States at the 2020 Summer Olympics. He was defeated in the quarterfinals by eventual gold medalist Roniel Iglesias of Cuba, who was 10 years older.

Professional boxing career
Johnson made his professional debut against Antonius Grable on the Terence Crawford vs. Shawn Porter undercard on November 20, 2021. He won the fight by a fourth-round technical knockout. Johnson next faced the unbeaten Xavier Madrid on January 29, 2022. He won the fight by unanimous decision, with all three judges scoring the fight 40–36 in his favor.

Professional boxing record

References

External links 

 Profile for Delante Johnson from Team USA
 

1998 births
Living people
Olympic boxers of the United States
Pan American Games bronze medalists for the United States
Pan American Games medalists in boxing
Boxers at the 2019 Pan American Games
Medalists at the 2019 Pan American Games
Boxers from Cleveland
American male boxers
Boxers at the 2020 Summer Olympics